Déborah Anthonioz (born 29 August 1978) is a French snowboarder and Olympic athlete who won a silver medal in women's snowboard cross at the 2010 Winter Olympics.

References

External links
  (archive)
 
 
 
 

1978 births
Living people
French female snowboarders
Olympic snowboarders of France
Snowboarders at the 2006 Winter Olympics
Snowboarders at the 2010 Winter Olympics
Snowboarders at the 2014 Winter Olympics
Olympic silver medalists for France
Olympic medalists in snowboarding
Medalists at the 2010 Winter Olympics
Université Savoie-Mont Blanc alumni
Knights of the Ordre national du Mérite
X Games athletes
People from Thonon-les-Bains
Sportspeople from Haute-Savoie
21st-century French women